St.  Anthony of Rome or Anthony the Roman was the founder of the Antoniev Monastery in Novgorod.

The hagiographic account on the life of Saint Anthony of Rome is only known since the second half of the 16th century. It claims that Anthony was born in Rome. and became an Orthodox monk there. After persecution of Eastern Orthodox believers started, he left the city and made a home at the seashore. Once, when he was standing on a stone and praying, a storm started, lifted the stone and in two days moved it along the sea to the city of Novgorod. Anthony, who did not speak Russian, was informed by a Greek merchant that he was in Novgorod, met with Saint Nikita, the bishop of Novgorod, and obtained a permission to found the monastery at the site his stone arrived to the shore.

It has been reported that the monastery church was consecrated by Anthony not in 1119, but that he was made hegumen only in 1131/32, immediately after Niphont was installed as the Bishop of Novgorod. This long delay is unclear; presumably it was related to some frictions between Novgorod church hierarchs. Anthony died in 1147 and was buried in the monastery.

Since 1597, Anthony is venerated as a saint by the Russian Orthodox Church. The feast days are January 17 and August 3.

References 

1147 deaths
Eastern Orthodox monks
Russian saints of the Eastern Orthodox Church
12th-century Christian saints
Year of birth unknown